The Oktoberfest is the world's largest Volksfest, featuring a beer festival and a travelling carnival. It is held annually in Munich, Bavaria. It is a 16- to 18-day folk festival running from mid- or late-September to around the first Sunday in October, with more than six million international and national visitors attending the event. Locally, it is called , after the colloquial name for the fairgrounds, Theresienwiese. The Oktoberfest is an important part of Bavarian culture, having been held since the year 1810. Other cities across the world also hold Oktoberfest celebrations that are modeled after the original Munich event.

During the event, large quantities of Oktoberfest Beer are consumed. For example, during the 16-day festival in 2014,  were served, making it the year where the most beer was consumed at the Oktoberfest. Visitors also enjoy numerous attractions, such as amusement rides, sidestalls, and games. There is also a wide variety of traditional foods available.

The Munich Oktoberfest originally took place in the 16-day period leading up to the first Sunday in October. In 1994, this longstanding schedule was modified in response to German reunification. As a result, if the first Sunday in October falls on the 1st or the 2nd, then the festival would run until 3 October (German Unity Day). Thus, the festival now runs for 17 days when the first Sunday is 2 October and 18 days when it is 1 October. In 2010, the festival lasted until the first Monday in October (4 October), to mark the event's bicentennial.

History

Kronprinz Ludwig (1786–1868), later King Ludwig I (reign: 1825–1848), married Princess Therese of Saxe-Hildburghausen on 12 October 1810. The citizens of Munich were invited to attend the festivities held on the fields in front of the city gates to celebrate the royal event. Horse races, in the tradition of the 15th-century  (Scarlet Race at Karlstor), were held on 18 October to honor the newlyweds. It is widely believed that Andreas Michael Dall'Armi, a major in the National Guard, proposed the idea. However, the origins of the horse races, and Oktoberfest itself, may have stemmed from proposals offered by Franz Baumgartner, a coachman and sergeant in the National Guard. The precise origins of the festival and horse races remain a matter of controversy. However, the decision to repeat the horse races, spectacle, and celebrations in 1811 launched what is now the annual Oktoberfest tradition.

The fairground, once outside the city, was chosen due to its natural suitability, which it still holds today. The Sendlinger Hill (today ) was used as a grandstand for 40,000 race spectators. The festival grounds remained undeveloped, except for the king's tent. The tastings of "Traiteurs" and other wine and beer took place above the visitors in the stands on the hill. Before the race started, a performance was held in homage of the bridegroom and of the royal family in the form of a train of 16 pairs of children dressed in  costumes, and costumes from the nine Bavarian townships and other regions. The first horse to cross the finish line belonged to Franz Baumgartner (one of the purported festival initiators). Horse racing champion and Minister of State Maximilian von Montgelas presented Baumgartner with his gold medal.

Transformation into a public festival

19th century

In 1811, a show was added to promote Bavarian agriculture. In 1813, the festival was canceled due to the involvement of Bavaria in the Napoleonic Wars, after which the Oktoberfest grew from year to year. The horse races were accompanied by tree climbing, bowling alleys, and swings and other attractions. In 1818, carnival booths appeared; the main prizes awarded were of silver, porcelain, and jewelry. The city fathers assumed responsibility for festival management in 1819, and it was decided that Oktoberfest become an annual event. In 1832, the date was moved some weeks later, as a Greek delegation came. It inspired them for the Zappas Olympics which became in 1896 the modern Olympic Games. Later, the Oktoberfest was lengthened and the date pushed forward because days are longer and warmer at the end of September. The horse race continued until 1960, and the agricultural show still exists today and is held every four years in the southern part of the festival grounds.

To honour the marriage of Prince Ludwig and Therese of Saxe-Hildburghausen, a parade took place for the first time in 1810. Since 1850, the parade has become an annual event and an important component of the Oktoberfest. Eight thousand people—mostly from Bavaria—and dressed in traditional costumes walk from Maximilian Street through the centre of Munich to the Oktoberfest grounds. The march is led by the Münchner Kindl.

Since 1850, the statue of Bavaria has watched over the Oktoberfest. This worldly Bavarian patron was first sketched by Leo von Klenze in a classic style and Ludwig Michael Schwanthaler romanticised and Germanised the draft. 
 The statue was constructed by Johann Baptist Stiglmaier and Ferdinand von Miller.

In 1853, the Bavarian Ruhmeshalle was completed. In 1854, the festival was cancelled after 3,000 residents of Munich including the queen consort died during a cholera epidemic. There was no Oktoberfest in 1866 because Bavaria was involved in the Austro-Prussian War. In 1870, the Franco-Prussian War again forced the cancellation of the festival. In 1873, the festival was cancelled due to yet another cholera epidemic. In 1880, electric light illuminated more than 400 booths and tents. In 1881, booths selling Bratwurst opened and the first beer was served in glass mugs in 1892.

At the end of the 19th century, a re-organization took place. Until then, there were games of skittles, large dance floors, and trees for climbing in the beer booths. Organizers wanted more room for guests and musicians which resulted in the booths becoming beer halls which are still used today.

In 1887, the parade of the Oktoberfest staff and breweries took place for the first time. This event showcases the splendidly decorated horse teams of the breweries and the bands that play in the festival tents. This event always takes place on the first Saturday of the Oktoberfest and serves as the official prelude to the Oktoberfest celebration.

20th century
At the 100th anniversary of Oktoberfest in 1910, an estimated 120,000 litres of beer were consumed.

Due to World War I, Oktoberfest was temporarily suspended from 1914 to 1918. The two years after the war, in 1919 and 1920, Oktoberfest was replaced by the so-called  (which can be translated as "smaller autumn celebration"), and in 1923 and 1924 the Oktoberfest was cancelled due to hyperinflation.

During National Socialism, Oktoberfest was used as part of Nazi propaganda. Two years later, Oktoberfest's 125th anniversary was celebrated with all the frills. The main event was a big parade.

The slogan proud city—cheerful country was meant to show the alleged overcoming of differences between social classes, and can be seen as an example of the regime's consolidation of power.

During World War II, from 1939 to 1945, no Oktoberfest was celebrated. Following the war, from 1946 to 1948, Munich celebrated only the "Autumn Fest". The sale of proper Oktoberfest beer—2% stronger in gravity than normal beer—was not permitted; guests could only drink normal beer.

Since its foundation, there have been 26 years in which it was declined.

Since 1950, the festival has always been opened with the same traditional procedure: At noon, a 12-gun salute is followed by the tapping of the first keg of Oktoberfest beer by the Mayor of Munich with the proclamation "" ("It's tapped!" in the Austro-Bavarian dialect). The Mayor then gives the first litre of beer to the Minister-President of the State of Bavaria. The first mayor to tap a keg was Thomas Wimmer.

Before the festival officially starts, parades are held with the traditional marksmen's clubs, beer-tent waitresses, and landlords participating. They start around 9:45 a.m. to 10.50 am.

During Oktoberfest, some locals wear Bavarian hats, which contain a tuft of chamois hair (Gamsbart). Historically, in Bavaria chamois hair was highly valued and prized. The more tufts of chamois hair on one's hat, the wealthier one was considered to be. Due to modern technology, this tradition has declined with the appearance of chamois hair imitations on the market.

For medical treatment of visitors, the Bavarian branch of the German Red Cross operates an aid facility and provides emergency medical care on the festival grounds, staffed with around 100 volunteer medics and doctors per day.

There is also a station for lost and found children, a lost property office, a security point for women and other public services.

Since the 1970s, local German gay organizations have organized "Gay Days" at Oktoberfest, which since the 21st century always begin in the  tent on the first Sunday.

1980 bombing

A pipe bomb was set off in a dustbin near the toilets at the main entrance on 26 September 1980 at 22:19. The bomb consisted of an empty fire extinguisher filled with 1.39 kilograms of TNT and mortar shells. Thirteen people were killed and over 225 were injured, 68 seriously. The case is still under criminal investigation by the State Police on behalf of the National Prosecutor General as of 2022 which had been stalled for several decades in between.

This is the second-deadliest terrorist attack in the history of Germany after the Munich massacre.

Federal and state law enforcement authorities initiated numerous official inquiries, concluding that a right-wing extremist, Gundolf Köhler, from Donaueschingen, a social outcast who was killed in the explosion, was the sole perpetrator. However, both this account and the number of perpetrators are strongly disputed by various groups.

Oktoberfest today

To keep the Oktoberfest, and especially the beer tents, amicable for the elderly and families, the concept of the "quiet Oktoberfest" was developed in 2005. Until 6:00 pm, the orchestras in the tents only play brass music, for example traditional folk music. Only after that may Schlager pop or electric music be played, which had led to excessively raucous behaviour in earlier years. The music played in the afternoon is limited to 85 decibels. With these rules, the organisers of the Oktoberfest were able to curb the tumultuous party mentality and preserve the traditional beer-tent atmosphere.

Starting in 2008, a new Bavarian law was passed to ban smoking in all enclosed spaces open to the public. Because of problems enforcing the anti-smoking law in the big tents, an exception was granted to the Oktoberfest in 2008, although the sale of tobacco was not allowed. After heavy losses in the 2008 local elections, with the smoking ban being a big issue in political debates, the state's ruling party implemented general exemptions to beer tents and small pubs.

The change in regulations was aimed in particular to benefit the large tents of the Oktoberfest: smoking in the tents is still legal, but the tents usually have non-smoking areas. The sale of tobacco in the tents is now legal, but is widely boycotted by mutual agreement. However, in early 2010, a referendum held in Bavaria as a result of a popular initiative re-instituted the original, strict, smoking ban of 2008; thus, no beer will be sold to people caught smoking in the tents.

The blanket smoking ban did not take effect until 2011, but all tents instituted the smoking ban in 2010 to do a "dry run" to identify any unforeseeable issues.

The year 2010 marked the Oktoberfest Bicentennial. For the anniversary, a horse race in historical costumes was held on opening day. A so-called  (historical Oktoberfest) took place, starting one day earlier than usual on the southern part of the festival grounds. A specially brewed beer (solely available at the tents of the historical Oktoberfest), horse races, and a museum tent gave visitors an impression of how the event felt two centuries ago.

In 2013, 6.4 million people visited Oktoberfest, and visitors were served 6.7 million litres of beer.

On 21 April 2020, Bavarian Minister-President Markus Söder and the mayor of Munich, Dieter Reiter, announced the official cancellation of the 2020 Oktoberfest due to the ongoing coronavirus pandemic. On 3 May 2021, Minister-President Söder and Mayor Reiter announced that the Oktoberfest hiatus will be extended, deferring the next one to 2022. Söder noted the unfeasibility of social distancing in the festival's beer tents, adding, "Imagine there was a new wave and it then became a super-spreader event. The brand would be damaged forever and we don't want that."

On the occasion of the 200th anniversary in 2010 a so-called  (Historical Oktoberfest) was designed on the site of the Central Agricultural Festival at the south end of the Theresienwiese. It opened one day before the official Oktoberfest with the traditional keg tapping by the Lord Mayor. Due to the popularity of the Oide Wiesn, it was established as a permanent feature from 2011.

The comprehensive five acres of fenced grounds presented historic rides, beer tents and other historical attractions such as a Steckerlfisch grilling, a chain swing and a cotton candy stand. Included in the price of admission, an animal tent and the racecourse could be visited next to the museum.

The animal tent included, among other things, a petting zoo, and was managed by the Hellabrunn Zoo and the Bavarian Farmers Association. The Munich Stadtmuseum took over the design of the museum tent. The Oktoberfest anniversary was accompanied by an artistic and cultural program, in which for example the Biermösl Blosn (local entertainers) performed.

The bands performing in the relatively small  Festzelt—offering 850 seats—had to do without electrical amplification.

The fest-tent name derives from a famous stage character of the actor Jörg Hube, who died in 2009.

The six main Munich breweries Augustiner, Hacker-Pschorr, Hofbräu, Löwenbräu, Paulaner and Spaten presented a special exclusively brewed dark beer, which was made after a historic recipe from the early 19th century.

The beer mugs in the beer tents did not have the company logo of the breweries, but rather the inscription "Munich beer". Unlike the usual Oktoberfest, the Historic  closed at 8 pm. Instead of the 300,000 guests estimated by the city council, well over half a million visitors came. The festival site had to be temporarily closed several times due to overcrowding.

According to the Munich City Council Decision on 16 October 2012, the entry fee for the Historical Oktoberfest, now called  (Bavarian for "old fairground"), in 2013 was to be three euros again. For the first time a re-entry was possible with the tickets. The historic rides in 2013 required a 1 Euro fee.

Other changes made at that Munich City Council meeting were that the musicians' tent increased the number of indoor seats from 1000 to 1,500. Outside tent seating increased from 800 to 1,000. They also supported the Showman Foundation with a contribution of €200,000, so it could run a museum tent, a velodrome, as well as a children's program. Also in 2013, the total festival area was enlarged and attractive entrances were added.

Lastly, according to a City Council decision, there will be an  again in 2015 before the Central Agricultural Exhibition claims the location again on the Theresienwiese in 2016.

The , also known as Gay Oktoberfest, refers to a number of annual LGBT events which take place throughout the Oktoberfest period in Munich. The main feature event is in the Bräurosl (Hacker-Pschorr) tent on the first Sunday and is sometimes called 'Gay Sunday'. Other events take place throughout the weeks of the festival with some requiring a pre-booking. These include meet and greets, Lion's night, brunches and cultural programmes.

The tradition of  traces its origins to the 1970s when friends of the Munich Lion's Club, MLC, a leather and fetish society, first booked the balcony at the  festival tent and were mistaken to have been a football club. However, the group was welcomed by the owners and waiters who enjoyed having them, and so the meet-up became an annual event.  is now one of the major events in the LGBT calendar in Germany with Gay Sunday alone attracting over 8,000 LGBT festival-goers. It is now the second-biggest LGBT event to take place after Christopher Street Day.

Highlights

Entry of the restaurateurs and breweries

In its current form, the parade has taken place since 1935, where all the breweries first took part. Since then, the parade is led by the Münchner Kindl, followed by the incumbent mayor of Munich in the Schottenhammel family carriage since 1950. This is followed by the decorated horse carriages and floats of the breweries and the carriages of the other restaurateurs and showmen. The music bands from the beer tents accompany the parade.

Beer barrel tapping

After the parade of the restaurateurs on carriages from downtown to the festival grounds, at exactly 12:00 clock the lord mayor opens the first beer barrel in the Schottenhammel tent. With the initial pass and the Bavarian exclamation, "!" (—It has been tapped!) the Oktoberfest is declared opened.

Twelve gunshots are then fired on the stairway of Ruhmeshalle. This is the signal for the other restaurateurs to start with the serving of beer. Traditionally, the Bavarian Minister-President is served the first litre of beer. Then in the other tents, the first barrels are tapped and beer is served to the visitors.

Every year, visitors eagerly await to see how many strokes the mayor needs to use before the first beer flows. Bets are even made. The best performance is still two strokes (Christian Ude, 2005, 2008, 2009, 2010, 2011, 2012 and 2013; Dieter Reiter, 2015, 2016, 2017, 2018 and 2019), and there was also 19 strokes required (Thomas Wimmer, 1950).

Costume and riflemen parade
In honor of the silver wedding anniversary of King Ludwig I of Bavaria and Princess Therese, a traditional costume parade took place in 1835 for the first time. In 1895, the Bavarian novelist Maximilian Schmidt organized another parade with 1,400 participants in 150 traditional costume groups. Another parade was organized for the 100th anniversary celebrations in 1910  by Julius and Moritz Wallach, promoters of the Dirndl and Lederhosen as fashion.

From 1950 to 2019 and resuming in 2022, this parade is organized annually and has become one of the highlights of the Oktoberfest and one of the world's largest parades of its kind. On the first festival Sunday, 8000 participants march in the parade in their historic festival costumes from the Maximilianeum on a seven kilometer stretch to the festival grounds.

The clubs and groups come mostly out of Bavaria, but also from other German states, Austria, Switzerland, Northern Italy and other European countries.

Beers

Only beer conforming to the Reinheitsgebot, and brewed within the city limits of Munich, can be served at the Munich Oktoberfest.

Beers meeting these criteria are designated Oktoberfest Beer although the name 'Oktoberfest beer' also denotes two distinct beer styles: a traditional Märzen lager and a paler  that is now more commonly served at Oktoberfest itself.

The breweries that can produce Oktoberfest beer under the aforementioned criteria are:
 Augustiner-Bräu
 Hacker-Pschorr-Bräu
 Löwenbräu
 Paulaner
 Spatenbräu
  Hofbräu-München

Oktoberfest Beer is a registered trademark by the Club of Munich Brewers, which consists of the above six breweries.

Facts and data

Size

The Oktoberfest is known as the largest  (folk festival) in the world.

In 1999 there were six and a half million visitors to the 42-hectare Theresienwiese. 72% of visitors are from Bavaria. 15% of visitors come from foreign countries including surrounding EU countries and other non-European countries such as the United States, Canada, Australia, New Zealand, and East Asia.

Besides the Oktoberfest, there are other public festivals that take place at the same location. In April and May the Munich  (spring festival) is held and the Tollwood Festival is held in December with 650,000 visitors.

After the Oktoberfest the next largest public fairs in Germany are: the Cannstatter Volksfest in Stuttgart with about 4.5 million visitors each year; the Cranger Kirmes in Herne (Wanne-Eickel) (the largest fair in North Rhine-Westphalia) with 4.4 million visitors; the Rheinkirmes in Düsseldorf (called the largest fair on the Rhine); and the Freimarkt in Bremen (the biggest fair in northern Germany) with over 4 million visitors per year each.

Dates

Since 1994, the Oktoberfest runs for 16 days with the last day being the first Sunday in October. However, if day 16 falls before 3 October (German Unity Day), then the festival will continue until the 3rd. (see table below)

*  (Bavarian Central Agriculture Fair)

Security at the Oktoberfest

Technical accidents have rarely occurred throughout Oktoberfest history. The rides are extensively tested in advance, and the examination is performed by the cableways and temporary structures department of today's TÜV SÜD.

On 30 September 1996, there was a collision on the Euro Star roller coaster, which injured 30, and was caused by a worn safety brake that went unnoticed during inspection. The Munich prosecutor tried to accuse the engineer, from TÜV Munich, of negligent injury, but the proceedings did not come to a conclusion.

To reduce the number of thefts, fights, and sexual assault cases during Oktoberfest, protection measures for visitors have been improved in recent years. For example, in 2003 the campaign  (Safe Oktoberfest for Girls and Women) was launched.

In 2004, a new service center was placed in the authorities court, in which the police, the Munich Fire Department, medical services, and a department of district administration is located. During the Oktoberfest, a police station specifically for the festival is installed, and can be reached with the emergency number 5003220.

Due to the numerous Italian visitors to the Oktoberfest, since 2005 officers from Bolzano, Italy have also been present. For decades, the Bavarian Red Cross has been responsible for medical service at the Oktoberfest.

Additional medical services are located in the  tent (Aicher Ambulance), and the Munich U-Bahn has commissioned additional backups in the rapid transit station  provided by the Johanniter-Unfall-Hilfe. In the authorities court, an ambulance and miniature hospital, complete with operating theater, are readily available. During the Oktoberfest, additional emergency vehicles are on the alert at the control centers, and extra staff is on hand in case they are needed.

In 2010, as a public safety measure, a dog and animal ban was put into place. 2012 brought the banning of glass bottles after the increase in the number of injuries and cuts.

The safety concepts of the event have been modified and adapted continuously over the past decades:

 After the bombing in 1980, the main entrance of the Oktoberfest was redesigned in 1981. 
 In 2001, a few weeks after 9-11 attacks, security checkpoints were added at the main entrance.
 In 2009, road blocks were raised, and access controls during the festival, due to the perceived threat of attacks by Islamists, were increased. 
 In 2011, the security measures were once again increased, this time with 170 partially retractable bollards also designed to prevent forcible access to the festival grounds with a vehicle. 
 The Bavariaring is closed off to allow security forces adequate space to react. Police can quickly divert the crowds if needed through radio communication, as well as closing down train stations.
 Following the 2016 Munich shooting, a retractable security fence was added. Previously,  of the Oktoberfest were still unfenced. 
 Up to 450 security guards will stand at the 13 official entrances and check all incoming guests.
 In addition, the front exit of the subway station  has been closed off.

Energy supply

The Oktoberfest is powered via 43 kilometers of cable and 18 partially underground transformer stations. The Oktoberfest's power consumption totals approximately 2.7 million kilowatt hours, not including assembly and dismantling of the attractions.

To supply the tents with natural gas, a four-kilometer long network of gas lines was built. The gas consumption amounts to 180,000 cubic meters for the kitchens of various catering establishments, and 20,000 cubic meters to heat the beer gardens.

Because even a short power outage could lead to panic, all power supplies have redundancy and are fed separately. Even the lights of the individual marquees are supplied from two different substations. Despite all the precautions, on 25 September 2007, several hours of power failure occurred after a cable channel had been flooded due to heavy rains. Since the power outage occurred in the morning, there were service shortages in the catering areas, but no panic resulted.

To ensure sufficient capacity of cellular networks, each year several mobile masts are set up in the lawn areas surrounding the festival.

Transportation

The Münchner Verkehrsgesellschaft (Munich Transport Company) reports transporting almost four million visitors, to and from, the festival grounds each Oktoberfest. Especially at night, the U- and S-Bahn trains are full. The underground station, Theresienwiese, has trains arriving at rush hour in three-minute intervals. The station occasionally needs to be closed due to overcrowding after the closure of the beer tents. People are also encouraged to use the nearby stations Goetheplatz, Schwanthalerhöhe and Hackerbrücke (the latter of the S-Bahn) or walk the short distance from the main railway station on foot.

There are significant negative effects pertaining to traffic. Since numerous festival goers make their way home by car despite having consumed alcohol, the Bavarian State Police carries out large-scale DUI controls. The city ring roads and highways around Munich are periodically blocked to allow only one lane of through traffic, which leads to massive traffic congestion.

Especially during the middle weekend of the festival, many Italians arrive with caravans (this weekend is therefore referred to by the residents of Munich as "the Italians' weekend").

In response, the government imposes camping bans in many parts of the city. At the same time, special parking outside the city is established, which can be reached by public transportation. Large parking areas are available, for example, close to the Allianz Arena. Nevertheless, the parking situation around the festival grounds is critical. As a consequence, the effort for controls and towing services is substantial.

2010, in coordination with the new security concept, taxi stands were relocated. They are now found outside of the security ring further away from the fairground.

Trash and toilets
For safety reasons (bombing 1980), there are no trash bins in public areas.

In 2004, the queues outside the toilets became so long that the police had to regulate access. To keep traffic moving through the toilets, men headed for the toilets were directed first to the urinals (giant enclosed grates) if they only needed to urinate. Consequently, the number of toilets was increased by 20% in 2005. Approximately 1,800 toilets and urinals are available today.

Many guests visit the quiet stalls to use their mobile phones. For this reason, there were plans in 2005 to install a Faraday cage around the toilets or to use Mobile phone jammers to prevent telephoning with those devices. Jamming devices are, however, illegal in Germany, and Faraday cages made of copper would have been too expensive, so these ambitious plans were dropped, and signs were placed instead, warning toilet users not to use cellular phones in the stalls. More recently, amplifying live music in the toilets has led to them no longer representing a quiet retreat for telephoning.

Tents

There are currently fourteen large tents and twenty small tents at the Oktoberfest. The tents are wooden non-permanent structures which are constructed for and only used during the festival. The beer (or wine) served in each is in the accompanying table.

Large tents

 —one of the larger tents, it is the first tent that many visitors see. Traditionally, in the evening, the Oktoberfest band  plays Oktoberfest classics.
 —translates as the "Crossbowman's Tent", a competition that has been a part of the Oktoberfest since 1895.
 Hofbräu-Festzelt—the counterpart to the famous , this tent is especially popular with Americans, Australians and New Zealanders.
 —reckoned to be the most important tent at the Oktoberfest, mainly because it is located at the beginning. On the first Saturday of the event, no beer is allowed to be served until the Mayor of Munich (currently Dieter Reiter) taps the first keg, at exactly high noon. Only then can the other tents begin to serve beer. The tent is very popular among younger people. A substantial part of the tent is guaranteed to traditional Studentenverbindungen (a particular form of student fraternities) and outfitted with their distinctive colors and coats of arms.
 —literally translates as "Winzerer's little flag" and refers to the name of an old crossbowmen's guild, itself referring to a military unit for the Thirty Years' War:  being a 16th-17th century German word for the equivalent of a company/battalion of approximately 400 mercenary soldiers. Kaspar III. Winzerer was the famous Bavarian captain of such a unit.
 —this is a mid-sized tent. Situated under the Bavaria statue, the current tent was newly built in 2004.
 —the smallest of the large tents at the Oktoberfest, it is frequented by celebrities, and is known for its especially good—and expensive—food. In contrast to the other tents (which must close by 11 pm), it is open until 12:30 am, and it can be very difficult to gain admittance.
 —translates as "wine tent".
 —above the entrance is a 4.50-meter (15 foot)-high lion who occasionally drinks from his beer. This is overshadowed by yet another tower where an even larger drinking lion sits.
  (Hacker-Pschorr)—translates as "brewer's Rosemary". Named after the daughter of the original brewery owner (Pschorr), this tent has the usual brass band and yodeler. On the first Sunday of the festival, this tent hosts the hugely popular gay and lesbian party, .
 —considered by many locals to be the best tent, due to the fact it sells the favourite local brew, Augustiner, from individually-tapped wooden kegs rather than stainless steel vats used by the other tents.
 —true to its name, this tent offers a great variety of roasted ox dishes.
 —translates as "Fisher's Veronika". Another of the smaller tents.  is the German word for fish and this tent carries a huge selection on its menu. The main dish is Steckerlfisch, which is grilled outside of the tent.

Small tents

 —resembling a large Bavarian hut, the "calf kitchen" has a lively party atmosphere.
 —in 1885, poultry dealer Joseph Ammer was allowed to construct his small booth at the Oktoberfest, creating the world's first chicken roastery. Duck is offered as well.
 —this tent offers exotic cocktails, Prosecco, champagne, coffee, donuts, ice cream, pastries, and strudel variations of all kinds.
 —created by Rischart, the café holds a daily commemoration of the occasion of the first Oktoberfest—the wedding of Ludwig I and Therese of Saxony.
 —since 1950 Café Mohrenkopf has been baking cakes and pies fresh daily in the Oktoberfest tent.
 —cheese and everything that complements it is the specialty of the house in this tent.
 —decorated with oil paintings, antique instruments and cooking utensils.
 —very popular among the locals, Heimer's is a family-friendly tent.
 —barbecue experts prepare pork knuckles in the only  (pork knuckle roaster) at the Oktoberfest.
 —the dumpling is an icon of Bavarian cuisine, and "preserving and spreading the dumpling culture" is the motto of this smaller tent.
 —with seating for about 100, Schiebl's coffeehouse tent is a meeting place for the whole family.  is the Bavarian term for a (coffee or tea) mug or pot.
 —a Guglhupf is a German cake, like an English bundt cake; this slowly moving carousel bar is easy to spot because it's shaped like one.
 —owned by the Wildmoser family since 1981, this small tent has been adopted and popularized by the Munich locals.
 —the newest tent at Oktoberfest, featuring intricately detailed woodwork and a hunting lodge ambiance.
 —"The  is as essential as beer, radish and chicken," former mayor Christian Ude once wrote: "An Oktoberfest without  is inconceivable."
 —famous for its traditional duck and roasted chicken dishes, atmosphere, and daily entertainment.
 —debuting in 2007, the Hochreiter family has brought back the former .

Other information 

 Experienced waiters need an average of only one and a half seconds to fill a Maß.
 Letters which are placed in the Oktoberfest mailboxes receive a special postmark from the post office.
 One attraction, which does not exist at other festivals, is the flea circus. It has been an attraction at the  since 1948 and a "team" of about 60 fleas provide for the entertainment especially for the children.
 After the attacks on 11 September 2001, in the same year, the traditional beer tapping was omitted, instead there was a contemplative celebration in  tent.
The city of Munich wants to prevent any accident to visitors at the construction site that the city would be accountable for.
 In 2015, the festival officially served  of beer; for perspective, that is enough to fill nearly three (2.9) Olympic-size swimming pools.
 One famous song in a beer tent is "" which means translated "A toast to cheer and good times". The band leader plays this song several times to invite the guests to toast and drink.
 With the cancellation of the Oktoberfest since 2020 due to the Coronavirus pandemic, this is the first year that the Oktoberfest has not taken place since 1949.
 In 2022, after 2 years, Oktoberfest was held again in Munich, Germany.

In popular culture
A German historical drama called Oktoberfest: Beer and Blood was released in 2020. Set in 1900, it focuses on the showman brewer Curt Prank as he transforms the festival into a global tourist attraction by replacing the local brewery stands with one large pavilion. Critics have compared the show's graphic violence and German new wave music soundtrack to Peaky Blinders. A second season was announced by head writer Ronny Schalk in 2021.

Gallery

See also
 Beer and Oktoberfest Museum
 Schunkeln (sway dance)

References

External links

 Oktoberfest website 
 Oktoberfest Map
 Oktoberfest Traditions
 Virtual exhibition: Oktoberfest – History, Background, Highlights, in the culture portal bavarikon

 
1810 establishments in Bavaria
Annual events in Munich
Autumn festivals
Beer festivals in Germany
Festivals in Munich
German folklore
October events
September events
Tourist attractions in Munich
Festivals established in 1810
COVID-19 pandemic in Germany
German records